Nada! is the third studio album by English neofolk band Death in June. It was released on 12 October 1985 through record label New European Recordings.

Track listing

Personnel 
 Death in June

 Christ '93' (David Tibet)
 Douglas Pearce
 Patrick Leagas
 Richard Butler

 Technical

 Porky – mastering

References

External links 

 

1985 albums
Nada!